Sheikh Hussein was a 13th-century Somali Muslim proselytizer who lived in Ethiopia and was from the famous port town of Merca, one of the power jurisdictions and cultural centers of the Ajuran Empire. He is now honored as a saint He is mostly known as being a member of the Somali 'Diwan al-awliya' (Famous Saints of Somali Origin).

History
Hussein was born in Merca. He is credited for introducing Islam to the Sidamo people living in the area at the time.  He is also credited for founding and establishing the Sultanate of Bale and is said to have performed many miracles. A number of these feats have been recorded in a hagiography published in Cairo in the 1920s, entitled Rabi` al-Qulub. He gave his name to the town of Sheikh Hussein, which is now within the homelands of the Oromo people. The city is a popular destination for approximately 50,000 Muslim pilgrims from various parts Ethiopia, who congregate there twice a year during the Islamic months of Hajj and Rabi' al-Awwal. The first pilgrimage in February–March is to celebrate Sheikh Hussein's birth; the second in August–September is to commemorate his death. The pilgrims traditionally carry cleft sticks known as "Oulle Sheikh Hussein", which are too small to serve as walking sticks and are not utilized for any practical purpose. Once they arrive at the shrine, the pilgrims take their turn entering the saint's tomb by crawling through a small doorway.

References

13th-century Ethiopian people
Muslim missionaries